Papua New Guinean Sign Language (PNGSL) is a sign language originating from Papua New Guinea. The standardised form of PNGSL was made an official language of Papua New Guinea in 2015.

The language has been called "Melanesian Sign Language". However, this does not translate what the community calls it, and is misleading because it is not used elsewhere in Melanesia.

Location
It is unknown to what extent and where PNGSL is used in Papua New Guinea. However, tests so far have found that speakers from different areas of PNG have been able to communicate with each other, though there is great regional variation due to the influence of home sign. Many children learning PNGSL were raised by hearing parents using home sign, and these children have markedly influenced the language at deaf gatherings.

History

Auslan (Australian Sign Language) was introduced to Papua New Guinea in the 1990s. There was influence from Tok Pisin and more importantly mixture with local or home sign, as the languages diverged to the point where, by 2015, it was estimated that they were only about 50% mutually intelligible and that native speakers of Auslan and PNGSL were not able to understand one another.

By the time sign language was made official, PNGSL was being used as the language of instruction in deaf schools and deaf units within hearing schools. Books purported to be of PNGSL up to this point were actually of Auslan. The first book of actual PNGSL is expected to be published in 2016.

Separate, local sign languages have been described in Enga and Chimbu provinces.

References

BANZSL Sign Language family
Languages of Papua New Guinea
Sign languages of Papua New Guinea